Agreste Potiguar is a mesoregion in the Brazilian state of Rio Grande do Norte.

Microregions
 Agreste Potiguar
 Baixa Verde
 Borborema Potiguar

Mesoregions of Rio Grande do Norte